Harlette De Falaise (born 17 July 1975) is an Australian and British designer, media personality and entrepreneur, best known for her work in Britain and Saudi Arabia.

Early life
Harlette was born to British parents in Sydney, and grew up in the small beach community of Little Manly.

Career
Harlette was awarded a scholarship for highest academic achievement and started university at age 16. She graduated from Bond University with an MBA and a Bachelor of Information Technology.

At the age of 30, she moved to London, where she gained contract roles at investment banks including Merrill Lynch and Morgan Stanley.

Fashion career
In 2005, Harlette founded the company Harlette Luxury Lingerie, to provide a one of a kind luxury lingerie concierge service, after a chance meeting at the Kensington chamber of commerce function with London Fashion Forum representative David Jones.

Harlette was accepted in early 2006 to take one of the 20 places given each year to be mentored by the London Fashion Forum program. Soon, she was interviewed by the BBC during London Fashion Week for a lingerie story. Wanting to research the market, she gained luxury retail roles including Selfridges and Louis Vuitton in Oslo, Norway in 2006 and 2007.

She gained widespread media attention in 2009 when she was the first woman invited to Saudi Arabia to run a 10-day master class on the Art of Selling Lingerie for 26 Saudi women. This was created to support the Reem Asaad lingerie KSA campaign started on Facebook in 2008 to enable women to work in lingerie stores. On 6 June 2011, King Abdullah of Saudi Arabia decreed that women should work in lingerie stores instead of men. Until this time only men had been allowed to work in lingerie stores. No formal lingerie sales or fitting training were available for measuring women for bras, no fitting rooms existed, and there were high censorship levels of information in the kingdom in relation to lingerie companies' websites, due to modesty laws.

2009 her 1st photoshoot Set Sail with Harlette went worldwide where a lingerie catwalk was held aboard the James Craig Tallship in Sydney

In 2010 Harlette made her debut in Paris at the Salon International de la Lingerie show with 3 pieces on the catwalk including a peacock feather skirt, luxury floor length wraps with French lace lingerie sets and a black velvet catsuit

Innovation Patent

In 2010 news broke of Harlette's patent, which had been awarded on 14 July 2009, for the world's first diamond and platinum garters. Her lingerie collection debuted on the catwalk in Paris at Salon International de la Lingerie, and the collection was invited to showcase at an Oscars style lounge in 2010.

In August 2010, The Economic Times listed her company as the 5th most unique company to provide services globally, just below the black label American Express card.

Harlette's brand received two nominations for the 2011 and 2012 UK Lingerie Awards, and was nominated as a finalist for the NSW Premier Export Awards 2011 in Australia.

Luxury Jewels

In 2012 Harlette creates the worlds 1st South Sea Pearl lingerie set and creates the quote "Its the little irritations that create the pearls and its the pressure that creates the diamonds"

Swimwear 
In the summer of 2013 Harlette debuted in Paris Mode City her first swim collection, and her unique one-piece design was picked for the Best of Show parade.

2015 the 1st Harlette catwalk on the island of Curaçao in the Caribbean International Swim Week and for the pilot show written by Harlette IT Girl Lingerie format presented at MIP Cannes

2016 the 2nd Harlette catwalk on the island of Curaçao in the Caribbean for International Swim Week featured a bikini 100% made in France in 6 days sewn, flown, photoshoot by the beach to be on the catwalk that was live streamed in just 6 days.

Wearable Technology in Fashion

2019 Harlette donates sensor tech to Copenhagen Suborbital for Christmas as part of her research into wearable sensor technology a worlds 1st

Media
In 2009 Harlette was asked by the Swedish newspaper Expressen to write a piece on a term she created, "Braconomics," and her insights on the Saudi Lingerie campaign. After leaving Saudi Arabia to showcase some of the collection at Wimbledon Fashion Week in 2009, Harlette was also interviewed by Radio New Zealand, New Straits Times, The Star (Malaysia), and Gold Coast Bulletin on the Saudi Arabia lingerie campaign.

The "Set Sail with Harlette" collection has been featured in the Wall St Journal, Hindustan Times, La Stampa, Bollywood blogs, CNN, and NDTV, featuring Miss World Australia 2008 first runner-up Sonia Lipski.

Images of Harlette's Secret Diary Collection were featured in The Sun, Buzz, The Mirror, The Daily Mail, Metro, and New York Post, and went to air on ITV2, Showtime and GEM.

The patented diamond suspenders and collection at the Oscars Style Lounge 2010, worn by Miss USA 2004, Shandi Finnessey, were featured in Luxist.

Harlette's designs have been seen in Maxim UK, worn by Hollie Dowding, Naomi Young, and Miss London 2011, Rissikat Bade, in November 2011.

Images of Melissa Reeves, Miss Galaxy England 2011, wearing Harlette's designs for her 2012 calendar, appeared in Maxim UK in December 2011.

Images of Carly Everett, NSW finalist for Miss Universe Australia 2012, wearing Harlette's designs, appeared in a Daily Telegraph article 16 April 2012.

Harlette was cited in the 2012 book Saudi Arabia on the Edge: The Uncertain Future of an American Ally, by Thomas Lippman, describing the first ever 10-day lingerie course run in Saudi Arabia.

Film and television costumes
In 2010, Billie Piper and award-winning costume director Edward K Gibbon chose the Harlette collection to be part of the fourth and final series of Secret Diary of a Call Girl by Tiger Aspect.

In 2011, the Harlette collection was seen on Billie Piper as Belle in episodes 2, 3, 4 and 5, with couture pieces appearing in episodes 6 and 7 on ITV and Showtime.

Pieces of the collection also appeared in episode 1 of Britain's Next Big Thing by Maverick Television, which aired on the BBC2 in UK and ABC in Australia.

In 2012, pieces of the Harlette collection were selected by stylist Simon Gensowski for V magazine's Valentine's Day film, directed by Justin Wu and shot in Paris.

In 2015, Harlette presented a preview of the pilot TV show IT Girl Lingerie, filmed on the Caribbean island of Curaçao for MIP Com Cannes, France.

Literature
Harlette is currently working on her debut series of nano novels Code of Conduct, Graphene, Back of the Plane and her novelty book called Red Book Red Book

Filmography

References

External links
 Harlette

1975 births
Living people
British fashion designers
Lingerie
People from Sydney
Australian fashion designers
Australian women fashion designers
British women fashion designers
Australian businesspeople